Daniel Troob (born February 28, 1949, in Forest Hills, New York) is an American arranger and orchestrator best known for his contributions to the Disney blockbusters of the 1990s & 2000s. He won Drama Desk awards for Big River (1985) and Rodgers & Hammersteins' "Cinderella" (2013).

Troob made his debut at Carnegie Hall at age 12 with an orchestral work orchestrated by himself and conducted by Leopold Stokowski.  It was the first time he attended a concert at Carnegie Hall.  He graduated from Forest Hills High School, Class of '66 and graduated with Honors in Music Composition at Harvard University in 1970.

Troob's most popular Disney feature film credits include Beauty and the Beast, Aladdin, Newsies, The Lion King, Pocahontas, Hercules, Enchanted and  Tangled.

His Broadway credits start with dance music to Pacific Overtures (1976), Baker's Wife (1977), and orchestrations include How to Succeed in Business Without Really Trying with Matthew Broderick (1996), The Pajama Game (2006) with Harry Connick, Jr., as well as the Disney movie musical adaptions and Shrek The Musical (2008) for Broadway.

He was nominated for an Annie Award in 2001 for Outstanding Individual Achievement for Musical Score for an Animated Feature Production for The Little Mermaid II: Return to the Sea.

He currently lives in New York City.

Stage work

2014 - Aladdin
2013 - Rodgers + Hammerstein's Cinderella
2011 - Newsies
2010 - The Addams Family (additional orchestrations)
2009 - The 101 Dalmatians Musical
2008 - Shrek the Musical
2008 - Gypsy (Revival) (special keyboard arrangements)
2008 - The Little Mermaid
2006 - The Pajama Game
2005 - Chita Rivera: The Dancer's Life (Revue)
2003 - Little Shop of Horrors
1998 - Footloose
1997 - King David (additional orchestrations)
1995 - How to Succeed in Business Without Really Trying (Revival)
1994 - Beauty and the Beast
1992 - My Favorite Year (orchestration for "Manhattan")
1988 - Legs Diamond (additional orchestrations)
1988 - Romance/Romance (additional orchestrations)
1985 - Big River (orchestrated and music supervised)
1984 - The Three Musketeers (Revival) (additional orchestrations)
1981 - Bring Back Birdie (music and dance arrangements)
1980 - Happy New Year (additional orchestrations)
1979 - Saravà
1977 - Side by Side by Sondheim (Revue)
1976 - Pacific Overtures (dance music)
1975 - Goodtime Charley (dance arrangements)

Filmography
2018 -  Mary Poppins Returns (additional orchestrations) 
2010 - Tangled (additional orchestrations)
2009 - The 63rd Annual Tony Awards (TV special) (orchestrator)
2007 - Enchanted (orchestrator, all songs and animated score) 
2005 - Once Upon a Mattress (TV movie) (lead orchestrator)
2005 - The Producers (additional orchestrator: score)
2004 - Noel (conductor, music arranger, orchestrator)
2004 - Home on the Range (additional orchestrator)
2001 - South Pacific (TV movie) (song orchestrator)
2001 - Lady and the Tramp II: Scamp's Adventure (video) (conductor: score, orchestrator)
2000 - The Little Mermaid 2: Return to the Sea (video) (conductor: score, orchestrator: score)
2000 - Geppetto (TV movie) (song orchestrator)
1999 - Annie (TV movie) (musical underscore, orchestrator)
1998 - Cousin Bette (music adaptor, music arranger: songs, musician: piano, orchestrator)
1997 - Cinderella (TV movie) (composer: additional music, music adaptor, music arranger: songs)
1997 - Hercules (music arranger, orchestrator)
1996 - The Hunchback of Notre Dame (additional score orchestrator)
1995 - Pocahontas (conductor: score, music arranger: songs, orchestrator)
1995 - A Goofy Movie (arranger & orchestrator: "After Today")
1994 - The Lion King (additional arrangement: song)
1992 - Aladdin (orchestrations: song and score, songs arranged by)
1992 - Newsies (music arranger: vocal arrangements, songs orchestrated & conducted)
1992 - Home Alone 2: Lost in New York (arranger: "My Christmas Tree")
1992 - Shining Through (orchestrator)
1991 - Beauty and the Beast (orchestrator, songs arranger)

Film composer
2001 - Lady and the Tramp II: Scamp's Adventure (video)
2000 - The Little Mermaid 2: Return to the Sea (video)
1997 - Boys Life 2 (segment "Trevor")
1994 - Trevor (short) 
1998 - Cousin Bette (music: "The Other Side of Heaven", "The Tiger Song", "The Devil Song", "Farewell, My Friends", "Le Carilloneur" / lyrics: "The Other Side of Heaven", "The Tiger Song", "The Devil Song", "Farewell, My Friends", "Le Carilloneur" / performer: "Spera O'Marinar", "Nelly's Air" / "Wedding Polka", "Wedding Waltz", "Can Can")
1997 - Cinderella (TV movie) (music: "Transformation")

References

External links
Danny Troob at the Internet Broadway Database

1949 births
American music arrangers
Drama Desk Award winners
Forest Hills High School (New York) alumni
Harvard University alumni
Living people